Ray Charles Thielemann  (born August 12, 1955) is a former American football guard  in the National Football League for the Atlanta Falcons and the Washington Redskins.  Thielemann played college football at the University of Arkansas and was drafted in the second round of the 1977 NFL Draft. In college, Thielemann helped Arkansas to a 10-2 record, win a share of the 1975 Southwest Conference championship, beat the Georgia Bulldogs in the 1976 Cotton Bowl Classic 31-10, and finish ranked #7 in the final AP poll. He also was on the Super Bowl XXII championship Washington Redskins team in 1987 as a member of the famed "Hogs", which is what the Washington offensive linemen were called then. 

1955 births
Living people
American football offensive guards
Atlanta Falcons players
Washington Redskins players
National Conference Pro Bowl players
Arkansas Razorbacks football players
Players of American football from Houston